José Miguel Fornieles y Torres (January 18, 1932 – February 11, 1998) was a Major League Baseball pitcher from La Habana, Cuba. The right-hander pitched a one hitter in his major league debut on September 2, .

Washington Senators
Fornieles signed with the Washington Senators at eighteen years old, and went 17-6 with a 2.86 earned run average for the Big Spring Broncs of the Longhorn League in his first professional season. In , Fornieles went 14-12 with a 2.66 ERA for his hometown Havana Cubans, and received a call up to the Senators that September. In the second game of a September 2 double header with the Philadelphia Athletics, the only hit Fornieles allowed was a second inning single by Joe Astroth. He also allowed six walks, but did not allow a single base runner from the sixth inning on.

On September 19, Fornieles was called upon by manager Bucky Harris to relieve Julio Moreno in the second inning against the Boston Red Sox. Already trailing 3-0, Fornieles held the Bosox scoreless on three hits for the remainder of the game. He also scored one of the five runs his Senators scored on their way to a come from behind victory.

He ended the season at 2-2 with a 1.37 ERA. With the Senators in need of left-handed pitching, he was dealt to the Chicago White Sox at the Winter meetings for Chuck Stobbs.

Chicago White Sox
After getting off to a decent start to the  season, Fornieles began to sputter. His 8.68 ERA in the month of June led manager Paul Richards to lose faith in him. After sitting on the bench unused for two weeks, he was optioned to the Charleston Senators of the American Association in mid-July. He returned to the White Sox in September, but made just one appearance. After also splitting the  season between the White Sox and minor leagues, Fornieles was traded at the start of the  season with George Kell, Connie Johnson and Bob Nieman to the Baltimore Orioles for Jim Wilson and Dave Philley.

Baltimore Orioles
Paul Richards, now managing the Orioles used Fornieles much more regularly in Baltimore. In a little over a year with the club, Fornieles pitched 168 innings in 45 appearances. On June 14, he was traded to the Boston Red Sox for infielder Billy Goodman.

Boston Red Sox
Between his two clubs, Fornieles pitched a career high 182.1 innings in 1957.

In , he went 10-5 with a 2.64 ERA, and tied the Cleveland Indians' Johnny Klippstein for the league lead with fourteen saves. Fornieles also had an AL best 48 games finished, and set a major league record with seventy appearances out of the bullpen. He was the first ever recipient of the Sporting News AL Fireman of the Year Award.

Fornieles' eight saves at the 1961 All-Star break earned him a selection to Paul Richards' AL squad. He appeared in the eighth inning of the game, and surrendered a home run to the first batter he faced, the Chicago Cubs' George Altman. After retiring Willie Mays on a flyball to center, he gave up a single to Frank Robinson before being lifted in favor of Hoyt Wilhelm. A second All-Star game was held on July 31, however, Fornieles was not included on that team. Fornieles ended the season with a career high fifteen saves. He also brought his ERA down to 4.68.

Used as a starter in a June 20 doubleheader with the Cleveland Indians, Fornieles tied a modern major league record by hitting four Cleveland batters with pitches. On June 14, Fornieles' contract was sold to the Minnesota Twins in order to make room on the major league roster for pitching prospect Bob Heffner.

Retirement
Fornieles went 1-1 with a 4.76 ERA for the Twins before being released on July 22, 1963. He signed with the Cincinnati Reds in February , but failed to make the club out of Spring training. He died in St. Petersburg, Florida at the age of 66.

Career stats

Fornieles' only career home run came on September 8, 1961 against the Detroit Tigers' Paul Foytack.

Caribbean career
In between, Fornieles played winter ball with the Tigres de Marianao club of the Cuban Professional Baseball League in a span of eight seasons from 1952-53 – 1960-61.

In the 1952–1953 season, Fornieles posted a 12-5 record for Marianao while leading the Cuban League pitchers with a 2.33 ERA. He pitched 155 innings in 29 games, and earned the league's Rookie of the Year honors.

During the 1956-1957 season, Fornieles went 11-7 with a 2.47 ERA in 29 pitching appearances, allowing only 115 hits in 142 innings of work. With a one-two punch in the rotation of Jim Bunning and Fornieles, Marianao defeated the defending champion Elefantes de Cienfuegos and their ace Camilo Pascual to win the title and represent Cuba in the 1957 Caribbean Series.

In Game 4 of the Series on February 10, Fornieles hurled a three-hit, complete game 7–1 victory against the Leones del Caracas of Venezuela. After two days of rest, he started Game 10 on February 13, also against Venezuela. He did not record a decision, as Cuba scored three runs in the bottom of the ninth inning to win 5–4, and the Series title. Overall, Fornieles finished with a 1-0 record, a 2.81 ERA and 13 strikeouts in 16 innings.

Fornieles returned to Cuba in the winter of 1957-1958 to play for Marianao. In a very solid effort, he went 11-6 with a 2.09 ERA and 90 strikeouts in 155 innings. Once more, the Tigres captured the Cuban League title and advanced to the 1958 Caribbean Series. Fornieles started the Opening Game of the Series on February 8, and he led his team to a 10–2 victory over the Industriales de Valencia of Venezuela. On February 11, again with two days of rest, Fornieles faced Venezuela in Game 7. But he struggled this time and Venezuela scored eight runs in the first two innings en route to an 8–1 victory. Nevertheless, Cuba won the Series with a 4–2 record to become the first team to win its third straight championship (fifth overall) in Caribbean Series history. Overall, Fornieles had a record of 2-1 with a 3.08 ERA in his four series appearances, all against Venezuela.

Cuban Baseball League statistics
Some statistics are incomplete because there are no records available at the time of the request.

See also

List of Major League Baseball annual saves leaders

References

External links

SABR Biography Project

1932 births
1998 deaths
American League All-Stars
Baltimore Orioles players
Big Spring Broncs players
Boston Red Sox players
Charleston Senators players
Chicago White Sox players
Havana Cubans players
Major League Baseball pitchers
Major League Baseball players from Cuba
Cuban expatriate baseball players in the United States
Marianao players
Minnesota Twins players
Baseball players from Havana
Toronto Maple Leafs (International League) players
Washington Senators (1901–1960) players